The 2006 1000km of Nürburgring was the third race of the 2006 Le Mans Series season run by the ACO.  It was run on July 16, 2006

Official results

Class winners in bold.  Cars failing to complete 70% of winner's distance marked as Not Classified (NC).

Statistics
 Pole Position - #9 Creation Autosportif - 1:44.850
 Fastest Lap - #12 Courage Compétition - 1:47.247
 Average Speed - 161.621 km/h

External links

N
1000km of Nurburgring
6 Hours of Nürburgring